A list of comedy films released in the 1950s.

1950s

Comedy